Marcus Goree (born October 11, 1977) is an American former professional basketball player.

College career
Goree's collegiate team was the West Virginia University Mountaineers, where he played four seasons (109 games, starting 62), from 1996 to 2000.

Professional career
Goree started his professional career at the age of 23. Some of the clubs he has played with in his pro career include: Le Havre, Deutsche Bank Skyliners, Maccabi Tel Aviv, Gran Canaria, Benetton Treviso, CSKA Moscow, Triumph Lyubertsy, Estudiantes, and the New Yorker Phantoms Braunschweig. In January 2011, he signed again with Benetton Treviso. In August 2012, he signed with Cholet Basket.

Personal
On July 27, 2013, he married Iesha Goree.

References

External links
Marcus Goree at euroleague.net
Marcus Goree at eurobasket.com
Marcus Goree at fiba.com

1977 births
Living people
ABA League players
American expatriate basketball people in Brazil
American expatriate basketball people in France
American expatriate basketball people in Germany
American expatriate basketball people in Israel
American expatriate basketball people in Italy
American expatriate basketball people in Russia
American expatriate basketball people in Uruguay
Basketball Löwen Braunschweig players
Basketball players from Dallas
BC Zenit Saint Petersburg players
CB Gran Canaria players
Cholet Basket players
Centers (basketball)
Israeli Basketball Premier League players
Liga ACB players
Maccabi Tel Aviv B.C. players
Novo Basquete Brasil players
Pallacanestro Treviso players
P.A.O.K. BC players
PBC CSKA Moscow players
Power forwards (basketball)
Skyliners Frankfurt players
STB Le Havre players
West Virginia Mountaineers men's basketball players
American men's basketball players